Girolamo Barzellini (died 8 April 1688) was a Roman Catholic prelate who served as Bishop of Cariati e Cerenzia (1664–1688).

Biography
On 21 July 1664, Girolamo Barzellini was appointed during the papacy of Pope Alexander VII as Bishop of Cariati e Cerenzia.
He served as Bishop of Cariati e Cerenzia until his death on 8 April 1688.

Episcopal succession
While bishop, he was the principal co-consecrator of:
Lorenzo Mayers Caramuel, Bishop of Castellammare di Stabia (1676); 
Antonio del Río Colmenares, Bishop of Gaeta (1676); 
Domenico Antonio Bernardini, Bishop of Castellaneta (1677); and
Giacomo Santoro, Bishop of Bitetto (1677).

References

External links and additional sources
 (for Chronology of Bishops) 
 (for Chronology of Bishops) 

17th-century Italian Roman Catholic bishops
Bishops appointed by Pope Alexander VII
1688 deaths